The Wonder Wizard (model number: 7702) is a dedicated first-generation home video game console which was manufactured by Magnavox and released by General Home Products (GHP for short) in June 1976 only in the United States.

The console features two paddle-based game controllers attached to the system and contains the same circuit board as the Magnavox Odyssey 300 and the same bottom part housing as the Magnavox Odyssey. The paddles are larger than those of the Odyssey 300.

Games 
The system contains three built-in Pong-based games:

 Handball
 Tennis
 Hockey
Just like the Odyssey 300, the Wonder Wizard uses a switch so that the players can choose between the three preset difficulty levels.

Technical specifications 

 CPU: General Instrument AY-3-8500 ("Pong-on-a-Chip")
 Input: 2 game controllers/game selection, difficulty (pro, intermediate, beginner), and power button (on/off/reset)
 Colors? No.
 Sound? Yes, played through a built-in speaker.
 Dimensions:  (l x h x w)
 Power: 9 V AC adapter (100 ma) or 6 x C batteries
The switch box in the scope of delivery is the same as those of the Odyssey 100 to 4000. The top of the console was available in two versions: one with silver colored knobs and a woodgrain design in the upper section of the housing, and one with black knobs and a full woodgrain design.

External links 

 Wonder Wizard on www.old-computers.com
 Wonder Wizard on IMDb
 Wonder Wizard on MobyGames
 Overview of the Wonder Wizard and the other models of the series on www.pong-story.com

References 

Computer-related introductions in 1976
Dedicated consoles
First-generation video game consoles
Home video game consoles
Products introduced in 1976
1976 in video gaming